The 2012–13 Russian National Football League was the 21st season of Russia's second-tier football league since the dissolution of the Soviet Union. The season began on 9 July 2012 and ended on 26 May 2013.

Teams

League table

Results

Statistics

Top goalscorers

External links
Official website

Russian First League seasons
2012–13 in Russian football leagues
Russia